Protein melan-A also known as melanoma antigen recognized by T cells 1 or MART-1 is a protein that in humans is encoded by the MLANA or "MALENA" gene. A fragment of the protein, usually consisting of the nine amino acids 27 to 35, is bound by MHC class I complexes which present it to T cells of the immune system. These complexes can be found on the surface of melanoma cells. Decameric peptides (26-35) are being investigated as cancer vaccines.

Discovery and nomenclature 

The names MART-1 and melan-A were coined by two groups of researchers who independently sequenced the gene for this antigen in 1994.  Both names are currently in common use.  Kawakami et al. at the National Cancer Institute coined the term MART-1, which stands for "melanoma antigen recognized by T-cells."  Coulie et al. of Belgium called the gene melan-A, presumably an abbreviation for "melanocyte antigen."

Clinical significance 

MART-1/melan-A is a protein antigen that is found on the surface of melanocytes.  Antibodies against the antigen are used in the medical specialty of anatomic pathology in order to recognize cells of melanocytic differentiation, useful for the diagnosis of a melanoma.  The same name is also used to refer to the gene which codes for the antigen.

The MART-1/melan-A antigen is specific for the melanocyte lineage, found in normal skin, the retina, and melanocytes, but not in other normal tissues.  It is thus useful as a marker for melanocytic tumors (melanomas) with the caveat that it is normally found in benign nevi as well.

In many immunological studies melan-A peptides serve as a positive control for T-cell priming experiments. This is due to the fact that its high precursor frequency of about 1/1000 among cytotoxic T-cells makes it easy for antigen presenting cells to evoke peptide-specific responses.

Structure 

MART-1/melan-A is a putative 13 kDa transmembrane protein consisting of 118 amino acids. It has a single transmembrane domain.

Regulation 

Its expression is regulated by the microphthalmia-associated transcription factor.

References

Further reading